Polyphase may refer to:

 Polyphase matrix, in signal processing
 Polyphase system, in electrical engineering
 Polyphasic sleep
 Polyphase quadrature filter